Avents Creek is a  long 2nd order tributary to the Cape Fear River in Harnett County, North Carolina.  This is the only stream of this name in the United States. The lower reaches flow through Raven Rock State Park.

Course
Avents Creek rises in a pond in Duncan, North Carolina and then flows southwest to join the Cape Fear River about 5 miles west of Kipling, North Carolina.

Watershed
Avents Creek drains  of area, receives about 46.9 in/year of precipitation, has a wetness index of 403.31 and is about 50% forested.

See also
List of rivers of North Carolina

External links
Raven Rock State Park

References

Rivers of North Carolina
Rivers of Harnett County, North Carolina
Tributaries of the Cape Fear River